Agris is a commune in the Charente department in the Nouvelle-Aquitaine region of southwestern France.

The inhabitants of the commune are known as Agritois or Agritoises, alternatively Agritauds or Agritaudes

Geography

Location and access
Agris is located 19 km north-east of Angoulême and 5 km north-west of La Rochefoucauld by the D390 road which passes through the village or the D6 which passes through Pont-d'Agris.

The town is also traversed by the D11 from Vars to Chasseneuil-sur-Bonnieure and the D12 to Angoulême as well as by minor departmental roads: the D175 from Pont-d'Agris to Saint-Claud by the Bois de Bel-Air, the D40 to the nearby commune of La Rochette, and the D88 (called the Road of the Duchess) from La Rochefoucauld to Jauldes and Tourriers.

Agris is also 10 km south-west of Chasseneuil-sur-Bonnieure and 16 km south-east of Mansle.

The nearest railway station is at La Rochefoucauld which is served by the TER between Angoulême and Limoges. Angoulême Airport is 10 km south-west of the commune.

Hamlets and localities
The commune has many hamlets to the north-west of the village in the Tardoire valley. The main ones are Pont-d'Agris, located on the right bank and at the crossroads of the D6 and D11 and La Grange located on the left bank and on the D11 up to the heights of the village. On the right bank there is also the Les Camus, les Fougères, la Côte, la Brousse, les Garrauds, and on the left bank le Monac, chez Goby, les Martonnauds, les Chevilloux, which are almost part of the village. There are also les Vieilles Vaures in the south and les Treize Vents in the north

There are also many farms. The part of the forest west of the village is uninhabited.

Neighbouring communes and villages

Geology and terrain
The soil consists of limestone dating from the middle and upper Jurassic period (Callovian to Kimmeridgian from east to west). The plateau east of the Tardoire Valley is covered with alterite and flinty clay from the Massif Central close by (10 km east) and deposited during the Tertiary period. The valley is covered with alluvium and along the edges with sand and gravel terraces dating from the Quaternary period.

In the Braconne Forest there are excavations of Fosse Limousine, Fosse Mobile and Fosse Rode, which opens up in the form of a winding gallery in the upper reef. These collapses, sinkholes, galleries, and concretions form a caving site which is part of the La Rochefoucauld karst.

The relief of the commune is that of a low plateau sloping gently towards the valley of the Tardoire, with an average altitude of 110 m. The highest point is at an altitude of 134 m to the south-west in the Braconne forest near Gros Fayant. The lowest point is 70 m located on the Tardoire opposite the town of La Rochette. The village is 80 m above sea level.

Hydrography
The commune is traversed by the Tardoire and Bandiat Valleys.

Bandiat Valley is almost always dry in summer because its waters are absorbed by the successive sinkholes of the La Rochefoucauld karst so never reach the Tardoire Valley. The base of the Valley is nothing more than a ditch along a path between the Vieilles Vaures and the village. In winter the water still reaches the Vieilles Vaures but quickly sinks underground.

Tardoire Valley is also often dry in summer for the same reasons.

Climate
As in three-quarters of the department in the south and west, the climate is oceanic Aquitaine.

Dialect Area
The commune is in the Limousin region and marks the boundary with the Saintongeais local dialect (to the West).

Toponymy
There are two hypotheses for the origin of the name Agris:
Agris comes from the Latin Acrisium fundum or villa Acrisii meaning that the village was built around the property of a rich Gallo-Roman named Acrisius
Agris comes from the Latin ager meaning "field"

In the Middle Ages, Agris was called Agresio.

History

The remains of eight people have been exhumed (five adults and three children) who were hunter-gatherers from the Mesolithic period around 7000 BC.

Aerial photos reveal traces of ancient occupation in an undetermined era.

It is certain that the occupation of the site was very ancient as evidenced by the discovery of the Agris Helmet, a ceremonial Celtic helmet dated from the 4th century BC. which was found in 1981 during archaeological excavations in Perrats Cave. This site's primary occupation dated to the Mesolithic period in 7000 BC. and was reused from the Neolithic period in the Bronze Age to the second Iron Age in the Roman period and also during the Middle Ages.

In the same site in the Perrats Cave pottery of the second Iron Age was found.

Administration
Agris was created in 1793 as part of the canton of Jandes and the district of La Rochefoucauld but in 1801 changed to the Canton of La Rochefoucauld in the Arrondissement of Angoulême.

List of Successive Mayors of Agris

Population

Agris had its peak population in 1851 then lost 43% of its population from 1851 to 1921. Since then the population has stabilized around 700-800 people.

Distribution of Age Groups

Percentage Distribution of Age Groups in Agris and Charente Department in 2017

Source: INSEE

Economy

During the 19th century three stone quarries were operating in the commune: Chez les Foucauds in La Moussière and Chez les Fouilloux.

Shops
Two grocery stores, a tobacco shop, a restaurant, a bakery and a hairdresser.

Trades
A large number of tradesmen and entrepreneurs are present in the commune: electrician, motor garage, carpenter, mason, painter, plasterer-tiler, plumber, and agricultural workers.

Tourism
There are three rural cottages, with two open all year.

Facilities, services and local life
Agris has a post office.

Education

The school is an intercommunal teaching group between Agris and La Rochette. Agris has the Primary School and La Rochette only the elementary school. The Agris school is located in the village.

Sport and activities
The US football club of Agris plays in the Marc Labrousse Stadium.

There is also an association for playing tennis and pétanque, an equestrian centre located in Chez Pelet, a quad bike club, a motor-cycle club, a hunting society, a club for seniors, and an association of parents.

The commune has a leisure centre and a library.

There is also an autocross circuit that hosted the championship of France several times  but it has been closed since 2010.

Health
There are two general practitioners and one home help service.

Culture and heritage

Civil heritage

The Casque d'Agris (Agris helmet) is a ceremonial Celtic helmet dating from the 4th century BC which was found in 1981 during archaeological excavations in the Perrats Cave, a Late Bronze Age site. The helmet was made with a shell of riveted iron covering the neck and gold plating on bronze decorated with plant motifs. It is displayed in the Angoulême museum.
The Fouilloux site includes a moated structure dating to the Middle Bronze Age widely open to the west where stone ballast fills the moat.
The Statue of the seated god of Agris shows the existence of Gallo-Roman "leftist gods".
The Chateau of Fouilloux has a portal and Puyssaguet enclosure which are notable.

Religious Heritage

The commune has two sites that are registered as historical monuments:
The Croix de la Tuilière (Tuilière Cross) is a wayside cross located at the intersection of the local road from Granges to Le Bourg and the local road from Granges to Le Chevilloux.
The Parish Church of Saint Caprais (12th century). It depended on the priory of Saint-Florent de La Rochefoucauld. The church contains three items that are registered as historical objects:
A Harmonium (1860)
A Winged Tabernacle (17th century)
A Stoup for holy water and an Aspergillum (18th century)

Environmental heritage
The Braconne Forest, the Tardoire Valley, and the Bandiat Valley are of great interest for flora and fauna. They are a Natura 2000 zone.

Legend

Legend of the mobile pit: a man who killed his father and wanting to hide his corpse wandered all night to find this pit which concealed itself and moved constantly to avoid being complicit in the patricide. Exhausted, the man surrendered to police of La Rochefoucauld in the morning.

See also
Cantons of the Charente department

Notes and references

Notes

References

External links
Agris official website 
Agris on the Community of communes of Bandiat-Tardoire website 
Agris, Catillus Carol, 1999 
 Amigos del Románico, Descriptive page on the Romanesque Church of Saint-Caprais 
Agris on Géoportail, National Geographic Institute (IGN) website 
Agris on the 1750 Cassini Map

Communes of Charente